The Willisburg Historic District is a historic district which was listed on the National Register of Historic Places in 2014.

The district covers a crossroads community.  The roads crossing are Kentucky Route 433 (which runs northwest to southeast) and Kentucky Route 53 (which runs southwest to northeast).  These two routes coincide down the Main Street of Willisburg, but diverge at each end of the community.  The  listed area included 51 contributing buildings and one contributing site, as well as 47 non-contributing buildings and three non-contributing sites.

References

Historic districts on the National Register of Historic Places in Kentucky
American Craftsman architecture in Kentucky
Gothic Revival architecture in Kentucky
Colonial Revival architecture in Kentucky
National Register of Historic Places in Washington County, Kentucky